, born December 26, 1986, in Hiroshima Prefecture and raised in Okinawa Prefecture, is a Japanese model and actress. Azama signs her name "Mew" using romaji characters. She explains it in her profile: "美優 is read Mew. I was named from Kyōko Koizumi's famous song 'MEW of dawn'. So, the inscription is MEW."

Biography

History
Azama is a graduate of the Okinawa Actor's School and was a member of B. B. Waves (or Baby Waves) while she was there before graduating from the group in 2000.  She became "Miss SEVENTEEN" in October 2002 and was an exclusive model for Seventeen magazine until graduating from that magazine in 2006.

Her first internationally noticed role was as Makoto Kino / Sailor Jupiter in the live-action series Pretty Guardian Sailor Moon. Her co-stars thought of her as highly girlish and demure, the opposite of her forthright and tomboyish character.  Before PGSM, she played a lead role in a video for Echiura's song "Taisetsu na omoide".

In October 2006, she won the 38th "non-no model grand prix" from a pool of 5000 applicants. From December 2006 to December 2007, she was an exclusive model for the magazine, and then moved to another mainstream fashion magazine, CanCam.

On March 3, 2007, she performed at the 4th "Tokyo girls collection 2007 Spring/Summer" as one of the top 70 models in Japan.

On April 24, 2007, she became "JTA (Japan Trans Ocean Air) image girl in 2007."

Since April 2007, she has been performing on the information television program for women Omo-San.
As of 2012 she is a model for Can-Cam.

Works

Magazines
 2014-today: AneCan
 2007-2014: CanCam
 2006-2007: Non-no
 2002-2006: Seventeen

Television
 2007: Omo☆san - TV Asahi
 2008-2011: Zūmuin!! Satadē - Otenki to `Ani ★ suta' no kōnā tantō “Burosā”- NTV
 2012: Burosā - TV Asahi
 2012-today: News Clear - TBS News Bird

Dramas
 2003-2004: Pretty Guardian Sailor Moon: Makoto Kino / Sailor Jupiter- TBS
 2006: Gachibaka!: Ushijima Rie - TBS
 2006: Children: O o-tachi ka - WOWOW
 2006: Damenzuu o 〜ka〜: guest appearance - TV Asahi
 2008: Salaryman Kintarō: Iwashita Megumi  - TV Asahi
 2013: Doubles〜 futari no keiji: Masumoto - TV Asahi
 2013: Keishichō sōsaikka 9 kakari Season 8: Hyakutake Towako - TV Asahi

Film
 2021: The Pledge to Megumi, Yaeko Taguchi

Music Videos
 2005: Taisetsu na omoide - Echiura
 2006: Aozora Pedal - Arashi
 2010: moonlight/Sky High/YAY - moumoon (with CanCam model Maikawa Aiku,Yamamoto Mizuki and Tsuchiya Hazuki)

Anime
 2011: Heugemono Children's role - NHK BS Premium
 2012: Tokyo jōkyū date #15 Shonan - TVAsahi

Manga
 Hajikete B. B. (Imai yasue)

References

External links 
  
 VERTEX Mew Azama's agency.
 

1986 births
Japanese female models
Living people
People from Hiroshima Prefecture
People from Okinawa Prefecture
Japanese television actresses
Actors from Hiroshima Prefecture
21st-century Japanese actresses
Models from Okinawa Prefecture